An inflationary spike occurs when a particular section of the economy experiences a sudden price rise possibly due to external factors. For example, if a large amount of crop is destroyed, the value of the remaining crop will rise sharply. This will distort the overall measure of inflation  (headline inflation). Core inflation seeks to avoid the influence of these spikes by excluding areas of the economy such as food and energy which may be susceptible to such shocks.

See also
 Shock (economics)

Inflation